Klonowek may refer to the following places in Poland:
Klonówek, Łódź Voivodeship
Kłonówek, Kuyavian-Pomeranian Voivodeship
Kłonówek, Masovian Voivodeship